Schefflera stearnii is a species of plant in the family Araliaceae. It is endemic to Jamaica.  It is threatened by habitat loss.

References

stearnii
Endangered plants
Endemic flora of Jamaica
Taxonomy articles created by Polbot